Diaphormorpha is a genus of moths in the family Lasiocampidae. The genus was described by Yves de Lajonquière in 1972.

External links

Lasiocampidae